Rhys Williams (born 27 February 1984), is a Welsh professional track and field athlete, specializing in the 400 m hurdles. He is a previous European champion in the event.

Early life
Williams was born in Bridgend, the son of former Welsh international rugby union player J.J. Williams.  Rhys studied at Ysgol Gyfun Llanhari from September 1995 until June 2002. He was a member of the Bridgend and District D.C. Thomas winning rugby side at the age of 11 and was also the Welsh U15 backstroke swimming champion. He is currently studying for a master's degree at the University of Glamorgan.

Athletics career
Williams won the 400 m hurdles at the 2005 European U23 Championships, was European Junior Champion in 2003, and won the European Youth Olympics in 2001.

On 10 August 2006, Williams won the bronze medal at the European Championships in Athletics in Gothenburg in a time of 49.12 seconds, thus just slightly missing his personal best (49.09, set at the 2006 Commonwealth Games in Melbourne, where he finished fourth). He also ran 48.3 over the 400 m (2002).

On 13 August 2006 at that same event, he won a silver medal in the 4x400 m relay as the second sprinter, along with Robert Tobin, Graham Hedman and Timothy Benjamin, in a time of 3:01.63.  
 
On 31 July 2010, he achieved the Silver Medal in the 400 m hurdles at the European Athletics Championships in Barcelona, with fellow Welshman Dai Greene winning Gold.

Injuries
On 17 June 2008 it was announced that he would miss the 2008 Olympics due to a stress fracture to his right foot. He suffered the injury while taking part in the Welsh Championships two days earlier, which was the first time he had competed since suffering a similar injury a year earlier.

Doping violation
On 25 July 2014, on the second day of the 2014 Commonwealth Games where he was co-captain of the Welsh team, it was announced that he was suspended from all competition because of a doping violation at the Glasgow Grand Prix on 11 July. In January 2015 UK Anti-Doping gave Williams a four-month suspension, whilst accepting that Williams' positive test was due to taking a contaminated supplement and that he had not knowingly cheated. As Williams had already been suspended for more than six months the decision meant that he was free to compete again.

Personal bests

References

1984 births
Living people
Sportspeople from Cardiff
Welsh male hurdlers
Welsh male sprinters
Commonwealth Games bronze medallists for Wales
Athletes (track and field) at the 2006 Commonwealth Games
Athletes (track and field) at the 2010 Commonwealth Games
People educated at Ysgol Gyfun Llanhari
Team Bath track and field athletes
Athletes (track and field) at the 2012 Summer Olympics
Olympic athletes of Great Britain
European Athletics Championships medalists
Welsh sportspeople in doping cases
Doping cases in athletics
Commonwealth Games medallists in athletics
AAA Championships winners
Medallists at the 2010 Commonwealth Games